Same-sex marriage in Delaware has been legally recognized since July 1, 2013. Governor Jack Markell signed legislation legalizing same-sex marriage on May 7, 2013, just hours after its passage in the Delaware House of Representatives and Senate. Though Rhode Island enacted legislation legalizing same-sex marriage before Delaware, on July 1, Delaware became the eleventh U.S. state, and twelfth U.S. jurisdiction, to allow same-sex couples to marry, preceding Minnesota and Rhode Island by one month.

Delaware previously extended recognition to same-sex relationships in the form of civil unions, which granted same-sex couples the "rights, benefits, protections, and responsibilities" of married spouses. Civil unions became available in Delaware on January 1, 2012, following the enactment of legislation signed by Governor Markell on May 11, 2011.

Civil unions
In March 2011, senators David Sokola and Melanie George Smith introduced a bill to allow civil unions to the Delaware General Assembly. It passed the Senate Administrative Services Committee on March 31, and the full Senate by a vote of 13–6 on April 7, 2011. It passed the House of Representatives in a 26–15 vote on April 14. Governor Jack Markell signed the bill into law on May 11, 2011, and it took effect on January 1, 2012. At the signing, he said: 

Delaware civil unions provided the "rights, benefits, protections, and responsibilities" of marriage under a different name. Approximately 565 civil union licenses were issued in 2012, with 250 of these being issued in Sussex County, 235 in New Castle County, and 80 in Kent County.

As of July 1, 2013, civil unions are no longer offered to any couple and existing civil unions were converted into marriages by July 1, 2014.

Same-sex marriage
In March 2012, Governor Jack Markell said he thought that the legalization of same-sex marriage in Delaware was "inevitable" and would be passed "probably within the next few years". In September 2012, Representative Peter Schwartzkopf, who became House Speaker in January 2013, said he expected the General Assembly to vote on same-sex marriage in 2013 and that he would support it, but was uncertain of the legislation's prospects. On February 1, 2013, in anticipation of legislative activity, Francis Malooly, the Roman Catholic Bishop of Wilmington, authored a letter to parishioners stating that marriage is a covenant between a man and a woman that must be "cherished and defended".

In April 2013, a bill was introduced to legalize same-sex marriage while eliminating civil unions and converting them to marriages by July 2014 if not dissolved earlier. Malooly wrote a letter to legislators on April 15 that said that marriage is not "just about love and commitment between two people" as many think but "it is also about the unique expression of love that only and man and woman as husband and wife can give to each other", that marriage is not a "label" but a "communion" that "is impossible without the sexual difference". The Delaware House Administration Committee advanced the bill to the full House on April 18. Governor Markell said he would sign it if it passed. It passed the House on April 23 on a 23–18 vote. The Senate Executive Committee approved the legislation on May 1, and it passed the Senate on May 7 on a 12–9 vote. Markell signed the bill outside the Assembly building within an hour of the vote. The legislation was titled An act to amend Title 13 of the Delaware code relating to domestic relations to provide for same-gender civil marriage and to convert existing civil unions to civil marriages. The bill added the following section to the state's marriage statute:

The legislation also gave Delaware courts authority over divorce proceedings in the case of a same-sex couple married in Delaware who resided in a state that would not grant them a divorce because it did not recognize their marriage. Since June 26, 2015, same-sex marriage is legal throughout the United States, rendering this provision moot.

State Senator Karen Peterson came out as lesbian during the debate on May 7, becoming the state's first-ever openly LGBT legislator. When the statute took effect on July 1, Peterson and her partner were the first same-sex couple to legally convert their civil union into a marriage. The first same-sex couple to marry were Joseph Daigle and Dan Cole, in a semi-public ceremony attended by hundreds and officiated by New Castle County Clerk of the Peace Ken Boulden on July 1, 2013 in the Marian Cruger Coffin Gardens at Gibraltar Mansion in Wilmington. Opening remarks for the first marriage were provided by Attorney General Beau Biden, an invocation was provided by Rector of the Trinity Episcopal Church Pat Downing, and a reading was performed by poet Devon Miller-Duggan. Daigle and Cole were activists heavily involved in the process of passage, and Cole worked on writing and implementing the law.

Subsequent developments
A bill removing "homosexuality" and "lesbianism" from the definition of misconduct which may be used as grounds for a divorce was introduced to the Delaware General Assembly on March 13, 2016. The bill passed the  House on May 10 in a 36–4 vote, an the Senate on June 9 in a unanimous 21–0 vote. Governor Jack Markell signed the bill into law on June 28.

Marriage statistics
2,092 marriage licenses were issued to same-sex couples from July 1, 2013 to June 30, 2014. In Sussex County and Kent County, around 37% and 10% of marriage licenses were granted to same-sex couples, respectively. Same-sex marriages made up around 26% of all marriages statewide. The high percentage is mostly attributed to the fact that same-sex marriages could not be legally performed in the neighbouring states of New Jersey and Pennsylvania.

Public opinion
{| class="wikitable"
|+style="font-size:100%" | Public opinion for same-sex marriage in Delaware
|-
! style="width:190px;"| Poll source
! style="width:200px;"| Date(s)administered
! class=small | Samplesize
! Margin oferror
! style="width:100px;"| % support
! style="width:100px;"| % opposition
! style="width:40px;"| % no opinion
|-
| Public Religion Research Institute
| align=center| March 8–November 9, 2021
| align=center| ?
| align=center| ?
|  align=center| 66%
| align=center| 32%
| align=center| 2%
|-
| Public Religion Research Institute
| align=center| January 7–December 20, 2020
| align=center| 192 random telephoneinterviewees
| align=center| ?
|  align=center| 60%
| align=center| 29%
| align=center| 11%
|-
| Public Religion Research Institute
| align=center| April 5–December 23, 2017
| align=center| 219 random telephoneinterviewees
| align=center| ?
|  align=center| 58%
| align=center| 27%
| align=center| 15%
|-
| Public Religion Research Institute
| align=center| May 18, 2016–January 10, 2017
| align=center| 302 random telephoneinterviewees
| align=center| ?
|  align=center| 62%
| align=center| 25%
| align=center| 12%
|-
| Public Religion Research Institute
| align=center| April 29, 2015–January 7, 2016
| align=center| 239 random telephoneinterviewees
| align=center| ?
|  align=center| 66%
| align=center| 25%
| align=center| 8%
|-
|align| New York Times/CBS News/YouGov
| align=center| September 20–October 1, 2014
| align=center| 471 likely voters
| align=center| ± 5.2%
|  align=center| 54%
| align=center| 31%
| align=center| 15%
|-
| Public Religion Research Institute
| align=center| April 2, 2014–January 4, 2015
| align=center| 157 random telephoneinterviewees
| align=center| ?
|  align=center| 57%
| align=center| 31%
| align=center| 11%
|-
| Global Strategy Group
| align=center| February 12–14, 2014
| align=center| 603 likely voters
| align=center| ± 4%
|  align=center| 54%
| align=center| 37%
| align=center| 9%
|-
| Public Policy Polling
| align=center| January 26–28, 2011
| align=center| 605 registered voters
| align=center| ± 4%
|  align=center| 48%
| align=center| 47%
| align=center| 5%
|-

See also
 LGBT rights in Delaware
 Same-sex marriage law in the United States by state
 Same-sex marriage in the United States

References

2013 in LGBT history
Delaware
LGBT in Delaware
2013 in Delaware